Sakkaiyan Thirumalai Kullapakavudar Jakkaiyan is an Indian politician who served in the Tamil Nadu Legislative Assembly, representing Cumbum as a member of the All India Anna Dravida Munnetra Kazhagam from 2016 until 2021. In 2018, Jakkaiyan was one of 19 dissident AIADMK MLAs who faced expulsion from the assembly for opposing Chief Minister Edappadi K. Palaniswami, though Jakkaiyan later renounced this position and was not expelled.

References 

Tamil Nadu MLAs 2016–2021
All India Anna Dravida Munnetra Kazhagam politicians
21st-century Indian politicians
People from Theni district
Living people
Year of birth missing (living people)